Beaver Creek is a river in Chenango County, Madison County, and Oneida County in New York. It flows into Unadilla River north-northeast of South Edmeston.

References

Rivers of New York (state)
Rivers of Chenango County, New York
Rivers of Madison County, New York
Rivers of Oneida County, New York